Britain's Worst Celebrity Driver is a British game show, part of the Worst Driver television franchise, in which six British celebrities perform various challenges to prove their driving prowess. The show is presented by Quentin Willson for both series, with Jenni Falconer joining as co-host for the second.

Series
There have been two series, one in 2003-2005, and one in 2005. Additionally, more series were created in the non-celebrity edition, Britain's Worst Driver.

Series 1
The first series of the show was done in a similar style to the normal series (Britain's Worst Driver). The show was pre-recorded and contained no interactivity with the audience, with the winner selected by a specialist panel which included TV critic Ian Hyland and racing driver/TV presenter Vicki Butler Henderson
The five contestants that took part were:
Linda Robson (Actress)
Jeremy Spake (Reality TV Star)
Sarah Cawood (TV Presenter)
Paul Ross (TV Presenter And Film Critic)
Nicholas Parsons (Veteran Gameshow Host)

In the final result, no actual ranking order was given from best to worst. However, in the final episode, Quentin did mention that the winner was chosen from between two celebrities, both of which were at 'opposite ends of the driving scale'. This led to the celebrities believing that the decision was between the dithering Linda and the excessively aggressive Jeremy. In the end, Linda was given the vote as winner, which Quentin said was due to her inability to tell the difference between her left and right in the final challenge.

Series 2
The second series of the show saw some massive changes made to the format. As well as showing off their driving in a series of challenges, the celebrities would also have to drive from Land's End to John o' Groats, stopping at different locations in Britain along the way. The show also took on the style of a reality TV show, with the public having a say in who they believed improved the most.
The celebrities that took part were:
Joel Ross (DJ) - Britain's Worst Celebrity Driver
Suzanne Shaw (singer) - Runner Up
Brian Blessed (actor) - Eliminated 4th
Antonia Okonma (actress) - Eliminated 3rd
John Noakes (presenter) - Eliminated 2nd
Erik Estrada (actor) - Eliminated 1st

References

2003 British television series debuts
2005 British television series endings
2000s British game shows
Channel 5 (British TV channel) reality television shows
Automotive television series
Worst Driver (franchise)
Celebrity reality television series
English-language television shows